Bayapo Ndori (born 20 June 1999) is a Botswana athlete. He competed in the men's 4 × 400 metres relay event at the 2020 Summer Olympics and won the bronze medal.

References

External links
 

1999 births
Living people
Botswana male sprinters
Athletes (track and field) at the 2020 Summer Olympics
Medalists at the 2020 Summer Olympics
Olympic bronze medalists in athletics (track and field)
Olympic bronze medalists for Botswana
Olympic athletes of Botswana
Place of birth missing (living people)
African Championships in Athletics winners
Athletes (track and field) at the 2022 Commonwealth Games
Commonwealth Games silver medallists for Botswana
Commonwealth Games medallists in athletics
Medallists at the 2022 Commonwealth Games